Peter C. Eagler (born November 23, 1954 in Clifton, New Jersey) is an American Democratic Party politician from New Jersey. He was most recently a city councilman in Clifton, New Jersey, a position he had held since 2006. Eagler previously held a seat on the council from 1990 until 2002; he left the council after his sixth term.

Eagler is a former member of the New Jersey General Assembly representing the 34th legislative district. He served as an assemblyman from 2002-2006. Eagler served on the Assembly's Regulated Professions and Independent Authorities (as Chair), Telecommunications and Utilities (as Vice Chair) and Senior Issues Committees. He also served as a Passaic County Freeholder from 1996 until 2005.

Biography
Eagler graduated with a B.A. in 1976 from Fairleigh Dickinson University in Political Science and Russian Area Studies. In 1977 he began working as the Safety Inspector for the New Jersey Highway Authority, serving in that capacity for ten years until he was selected to head the directorship of the Heritage Festivals at the Garden State Arts Center. When the Arts Center was privatized, Eagler was assigned to the computer area of the Highway Authority, where he later worked.

In 1990, Eagler campaigned for and won a seat on Clifton's City Council. He was subsequently reelected in 1994 and 1998. While serving on the council, Eagler became a rising star in the county Democratic Party, and in 1995, was nominated with Harry Lashley to run against incumbent Republican Freeholders Walter Porter and Jack O'Brien. Although Eagler failed to finish in the top two, the Democrats stood him for election the following year with Georgia Scott, and the two gained the first two seats in what would eventually become an absolute Democratic majority on the Freeholder Board in 2000. Following the Democrats taking the majority on the Freeholder Board following the 1997 election, Eagler was elected to a one-year term as Freeholder Director. He again was elected to the Director position in 2001.

In 2001, Eagler decided to run for state assembly as a Democrat, alongside Willis Edwards III. Thanks to redistricting from the 2000 Census, Clifton, which for years, had been linked with several Republican-leaning towns and cities, was paired with many Democratic strongholds in Essex County. Due in large part to that, Eagler, Edwards, and State Senator Nia Gill swept the incumbent Republicans out of office. This enabled Eagler, with his seat on the Clifton council, and the Passaic County Freeholder Board, to hold three offices simultaneously. He did not, however, stand for reelection to the Clifton city council in May of that year, but was reelected in November to a third term as Freeholder.

Eagler stood for re-election with East Orange's Sheila Oliver replacing Edwards on the ticket in 2003. Despite a divided ticket, where Eagler and Oliver ran under separate Senate candidates, Eagler and Oliver were reelected along with Gill for a second term. He did not run for re-election in 2005, for reasons made unclear (it was not certain whether Eagler decided not to run on his own, or if he had been bumped from the ticket in favor of current Assemblyman Thomas Giblin), and combined with his decision not to run for a fourth term, as Freeholder Eagler left public office altogether.

After taking some time off, Eagler decided to attempt to regain a seat on the Clifton City Council. In May 2006, he was successfully returned to the council, along with three other winning candidates who ousted four incumbents (including three who had served multiple terms on the council). He once again stood for re-election in 2010 and 2014, retaining his seat both times, and ran for another term in office in November 2018.

In September 2022, Eagler announced his retirement from the Council after his six different full terms there (1994-98/1998-2002; 2006-2010/2014-18/2018-2022), along with his term in the General Assembly; that announcement came alongside Mayor James Anzaldi also announcing his retirement from the Council, after his nine consecutive terms as Mayor (1990-2022), with reported "infighting" among members of the Council over the direction of the City of Clifton early in the 2020s being their main reasons for suddenly wanting to retire from the Council.

District 34
Each of the forty districts in the New Jersey Legislature has one representative in the New Jersey Senate and two members in the New Jersey General Assembly. The other representatives from the 34th Legislative District for the 2004-2005 Legislative Session were:
Assemblyman Sheila Y. Oliver, and
Senator Nia Gill

References

External links
Assemblyman Eagler's Legislative Website
New Jersey Voter Information Website 2003
New Jersey Legislature financial disclosure form for 2004 (PDF)

1954 births
Living people
Fairleigh Dickinson University alumni
Democratic Party members of the New Jersey General Assembly
County commissioners in New Jersey
Politicians from Clifton, New Jersey
New Jersey city council members
21st-century American politicians
New Jersey Turnpike Authority